Ben Counter (1979) is an English writer fantasy writer, predominantly known for his numerous fiction contributions to various Warhammer 40,000 series. He is also the writer for the Out of Place podcast, a work of serialized fiction with over two dozen episodes.

Select works

Grey Knights series
 Grey Knights (2004)
 Dark Adeptus (2006)
 Hammer of Daemons (2008)

Soul Drinkers series
 Soul Drinker (2002)
 The Bleeding Chalice (2003)
 Crimson Tears (2005)
 Chapter War (2007)
 Hellforged (2009)
 Phalanx (2012)

Space Marine Battles series
 Malodrax (2013)
 The World Engine (2015)

Space Marine Legends series
 Cassius (2014)

The Horus Heresy series
 Galaxy in Flames (2006)
 Battle for the Abyss (2008)

Standalone novels
 The Hunt for Logan Grimnar, with Steve Lyons and Rob Sanders (2020)

References

External links

Ben Counter Profile at Black Library
Ben Counter Entry at Warhammer 40,000 Lexicanum

Living people
1979 births